Derrick J. Rossi (born 5 February 1966), is a Canadian stem cell biologist and entrepreneur. He is a co-founder of the biotechnology company Moderna.

Early life and education
Rossi was born in Toronto as the youngest of five children of a Maltese immigrant family. His father Fred worked in auto body shops for 50 years and his mother Agnes co-owned a Maltese bakery.

Rossi attended the Dr. Norman Bethune High School in Scarborough where he early discovered his passion for molecular biology. He then did his undergraduate and master's degrees in molecular genetics at the University of Toronto. He earned his Ph.D. from the University of Helsinki in 2003 and held a post-doc position from 2003 to 2007 at Stanford University in Irving Weissman’s lab.

Career
Rossi was appointed Associate Professor at the Stem Cell and Regenerative Biology Department at Harvard Medical School and Harvard University. At the same time he was a principal faculty member of the Harvard Stem Cell Institute and an investigator at the Immune Disease Institute (IDI), as well as in the Program in Cellular and Molecular Medicine at the Children’s Hospital Boston.

Moderna was founded in 2010, based on discovery that pluripotent stem cells can be transformed and reprogrammed. Time magazine cited this pluripotent discovery as one of the top ten medical breakthroughs of the year. He was also named as one of "People Who Mattered" for Time in 2010. He was cited because the discovery "involved the invention of a safer method for creating pluripotent stem cells... a new method (which) could help move stem cell–based treatments for diseases such as diabetes and Parkinson’s more quickly from the lab to the clinic." Rossi was selected one of the 100 Most Influential People in 2011 by Time.

In 2013 Rossi, Chien and their team reported that they "were able to improve heart function in mice and enhance their long-term survival with a "redirection of their [stem cell] differentiation toward cardiovascular cell types" in a significant step towards regenerative therapeutics for Moderna. In the same year and on the strength of the same paper Moderna was able to partner with AstraZeneca in exchange for $240 million "in upfront cash (plus much more in potential milestone payments)", and then received from other investors $110 million.

In 2014 Rossi retired from his functions at the board and as a scientific advisor at Moderna.

In 2015 Rossi was scientific co-founder of Intellia Therapeutics, which uses CRISPR gene editing for developing new drugs for treating genetic diseases. In 2016 Rossi co-founded Magenta Therapeutics focussing on hematopoietic stem cell transplantation in order to reset the patient’s immune system in case of autoimmune diseases, blood cancers and genetic diseases. Rossi was involved in the foundation of Stelexis Therapeutics, which develops new medication for treating cancerous stem cells.

In 2018 Rossi retired from all of his Harvard positions in order to focus on his activities as an entrepreneur. Rossi currently serves as the interim CEO of the New York Stem Cell Foundation. Rossi is now the CEO of Convelo Therapeutics.

Scientific contributions
Rossi develops and promotes new therapies using biotechnological methods thus contributing to novel approaches in regenerative medicine. His research focussed on different aspects of stem cell biology. In order to avoid ethical issues related to the use and exploitation of human stem cells, Rossi based his developments on the results of Katalin Karikó and Drew Weissman on mRNA. He succeeded in finding investors for his plans to transfer these findings into new medications and vaccinations by founding Moderna.

Rossi is on record as writing of his synthetic modified mRNA: "because our technology is RNA based, it completely eliminates the risk of genomic integration and insertional mutagenesis inherent to all DNA-based methodologies." The abstract from this paper which earned him recognition of Time reads in part: "Here we describe a simple, nonintegrating strategy for reprogramming cell fate based on administration of synthetic mRNA modified to overcome innate antiviral responses (in Murine embryos and human epidermis and human ESC-derived dH1f and MRC-5 fetal lung fibroblasts, Detroit 551 human fetal skin fibroblasts, BJ neonatal foreskin fibroblasts, and fibroblast-like cells cultured from a primary skin biopsy taken from an adult cystic fibrosis patient). We show that this approach can reprogram multiple human cell types to pluripotency with efficiencies that greatly surpass established protocols (for neuronal myocyte or cardiomyocyte targets). We further show that the same technology can be used to efficiently direct the differentiation of RNA-induced pluripotent stem cells (RiPSCs) into terminally differentiated myogenic cells. This technology represents a safe, efficient strategy for somatic cell reprogramming and directing cell fate that has broad applicability for basic research, disease modeling, and regenerative medicine."

In his 2010 paper, Rossi described his preference for "complexing the RNA with a cationic vehicle to facilitate uptake by endocytosis" instead of electroporation because "this would allow for repeated transfection to sustain ectopic protein expression over the days to weeks required for cellular reprogramming." Rossi and his team "treated synthesized RNA with a phosphatase" to overcome the interferon resistance pathway, and substituted "5-methylcytidine (5mC) for cytidine" and "pseudouridine for uridine". The team hit upon a "modified ribonucleotides and phosphatase treatment" (henceforth "mod-RNAs") and masked the mod-RNA past the interferon barrier through use of the vaccinia virus B18R protein, which served as inhibitor, but still the kinetics dictated a daily transfection treatment regime. Valproic acid, a histone deacetylase inhibitor, was used because it had been reported to increase reprogramming efficiency.

In 2021 he was awarded the Princess of Asturias Award in the category "Scientific Research".

Selected papers

Family life
Rossi is married to Finnish biologist Nina Korsisaari and father of three daughters.

References

External links

 Convelo Therapeutics: Team
 Derrick Rossi, PhD

Living people
1966 births
21st-century Canadian biologists
Place of birth missing (living people)
University of Toronto alumni
University of Helsinki alumni
Harvard University faculty
Harvard Medical School faculty
Canadian people of Maltese descent
Moderna people